Nelson Mandela Boulevard (old name: Jordan Street and Africa Boulevard) still known as Jordan is an affluent and upper-class district in northern Tehran, and some people draw similarities between Jordan District as being much alike Kensington District in London, UK as the area is a mixture of residential and commercial locale, filled with the homes and businesses of many politicians, diplomats, expatriates, and artists. Before the Iranian Revolution in 1979 it was called Jordan street, named after the American presbyterian missionary  Samuel M. Jordan and used to be one of the most popular avenue in Tehran, Iran. Renamed Nelson Mandela Boulevard in recent years, it is amongst the most famous streets in north Tehran after Valiasr Street which is the longest conventional street in the Middle East, spanning a south–north axis. It is also famous for being one of the liveliest streets of Tehran, experiencing regular traffic jams even at 2:00A.M during Summer.

Location
Nelson Mandela Boulevard is the most famous street in Tehran after Valiasr Avenue which is the longest street in Middle East, spanning a south–north axis. It is also famous for being one of the liveliest streets of Tehran, experiencing regular traffic jams even at 2:00am during the Summer.

The tree-lined boulevard is connected to Valiasr Street (ex-"Pahlavi Avenue") via crossing streets branching from its west side while the east side leads to cul de sacs bordering Modares Expressway.

Characteristics
Although its reputation as being the most prestigious residential area is now overtaken by some areas further north like Zafaraniyeh, Elahiyeh, Fereshteh, saadat abad, and Niavaran, it is nevertheless still home to very expensive real estate and an essential playground for the rich,  with many boutique shopping centers, chic cafes and restaurants, extravagant florists, art galleries, beauty salons, language schools, etc., the ultimate place to see and to be seen for fashionable Tehranis who have a desire to show off their possessions.

Rendezvous boys and girls, cruising the streets in cars during evening hours specially on Friday afternoons, used to be an indispensable part of Jordan's image and the car-flirting culture there had developed into an accomplished syllabus through 1990s and early 2000s. The sight for such encounters however has now changed to Andarzgou boulevard in Farmanieh.

The area, together with its neighboring Valiasr Ave, is suffering from severe traffic congestion due to rapid commercialization and lack of direct highway access.

It is also the home to the Italian, Polish, Bulgarian, Greek, Venezuelan, Sri Lankan, Mexican, Uruguayan, Kenyan, Brunei, Qatari, Kuwaiti, Omani and some other Arabs embassies as well as home of a lot of ambassador of countries and also many ministries are located there.

Name dispute
Since the boulevard was renamed after the Iranian Revolution to Africa, many locals and foreigners alike continue to refer to the area as Jordan. This is presumably due to the effect of the wealthy inhabitants refusing to accept the new government's name.

History

The avenue was formerly named after Dr. Samuel Jordan, the founder and the head of the American College of Tehran (later Alborz High School) from the 1910s to 1941.

See also
Jordan, Tehran

External links

Streets in Tehran
Neighbourhoods in Tehran